Cupressocrinites is an extinct genus of crinoids from the Middle to Late Devonian of Asia, Australia, Europe, Morocco, and North America.

References

External links
 Cupressocrinites in the Paleobiology Database

Cladida
 Prehistoric crinoid genera
 Devonian crinoids
 Devonian echinoderms of Asia
 Devonian echinoderms of Oceania
 Devonian echinoderms of Europe
 Devonian echinoderms of North America
 Middle Devonian first appearances
 Late Devonian animals
 Late Devonian genus extinctions